Léon Vanderstuyft (5 May 1890 – 26 February 1964) was a Belgian cyclist. After winning a bronze medal at the UCI Motor-paced World Championships in 1908 in the amateurs division he turned professional and won a silver and a gold medal in 1910 and 1922, respectively.

On 29 September 1928 he set a world speed record of 122.771 km/h riding behind a pacer.

His father Fritz and elder brother Arthur were also professional cyclists.

References

1890 births
1964 deaths
Belgian male cyclists
Sportspeople from Ypres
UCI Track Cycling World Champions (men)
Cyclists from West Flanders
Belgian track cyclists